Norman James MacLean (September 21, 1920 – July 3, 2000) was a Canadian politician. He represented the electoral district of Inverness in the Nova Scotia House of Assembly from 1963 to 1974, and Inverness North from 1984 to 1988. He was a member of the Nova Scotia Progressive Conservative Party.

MacLean was born in Port Hawkesbury. He was educated at the St. Francis Xavier University and Dalhousie University, earning a M.D. degree at the latter. He married Dorothy Alicia Tobin in 1945.

MacLean died on July 3, 2000.

References

2000 deaths
1920 births
Progressive Conservative Association of Nova Scotia MLAs
St. Francis Xavier University alumni
Dalhousie University alumni